The Shire of Trayning is a local government area in the Wheatbelt region of Western Australia, about  northwest of Merredin and about  east of the state capital, Perth.

History

The current Shire of Trayning area was historically split between the Meckering Road District and Kellerberrin Road District.

The shire originated as the Korrelocking Road District, established on 30 June 1911, which covered Trayning, Wyalkatchem and parts of Mount Marshall and Dowerin. On 18 March 1912, a section of the district was transferred to the new Dowerin Road District, and Korrelocking was renamed the Ninghan Road District. Another section of the district separated on 18 June 1920 with the establishment of the Wyalkatchem Road District.

The Mount Marshall Road District split away from the Ninghan district on 6 July 1923, and the remaining district was renamed the Kununoppin-Trayning Road District on 12 October 1923.

It became the Shire of Trayning-Kununoppin-Yelbeni on 1 July 1961 under the Local Government Act 1960, which reformed all remaining road districts into shires. It was then renamed to the Shire of Trayning on 10 September 1965.

Wards
The shire has no wards, and all councillors serve 4-year terms. Previously, it was divided into 3 wards.

 Trayning Ward (3 councillors)
 Kununoppin Ward (4 councillors)
 Yelbeni Ward (2 councillors)

Towns and localities
The towns and localities of the Shire of Trayning with population and size figures based on the most recent Australian census:

Shire presidents

Heritage-listed places

As of 2023, 55 places are heritage-listed in the Shire of Trayning, of which four are on the State Register of Heritage Places.

References

External links
 

Trayning
Shire of Trayning